Mistella Rowe (born Misty Rose Thornton; June 1, 1952) is an American actress. She is best known for portraying the perky, squeaky-voiced blonde on the American television series Hee Haw for 19 years, often appearing as Junior Samples's assistant during used-car comedy segments. Rowe and other "honeys" on the series were notable for performing in cleavage-inducing halter tops, tight shorts, and country-style minidresses. Rowe starred in the 1978 Hee Haw spin-off Hee Haw Honeys, cast with then-newcomer Kathie Lee Gifford (then known as Kathie Lee Johnson) as the singing daughters of country music diner owners portrayed by Lulu Roman and Kenny Price. Rowe later appeared in a national road show version of the series entitled Hee Haw Honey Reunion.

Television
On television, Rowe portrayed the carhop Wendy in early episodes of the sitcom Happy Days and Maid Marian in the Mel Brooks-produced When Things Were Rotten (1975). Rowe's 1980s television appearances include several episodes of Fantasy Island and The Love Boat and portraying a country music singer on Airwolf. In films, Rowe has twice portrayed Marilyn Monroe, in Goodbye, Norma Jean (1976) and Goodnight, Sweet Marilyn (1989). Her other film credits include The Hitchhikers (1972), Loose Shoes (1980), The Man with Bogart's Face (1980), National Lampoon's Class Reunion (1982), and Meatballs Part II (1984), and the television movie SST: Death Flight (1977).

Stage
Rowe's stage credits include children's theater (Misty's Magic Moo Town), appearing as Patsy Cline in the off-Broadway musical Always...Patsy Cline, and the Atlantic City production Misty Christmas, Finally a Fruitcake You'll Like! In 2010, Rowe appeared in the self-written, off-Broadway musical Fandance: The Legend of Sally Rand.

In other media
Austin, Texas rock band Young Heart Attack wrote a song called "Misty Rowe". In a 2004 interview, songwriter Steven Hall said about the song: "I was obsessed with this actress [Rowe] who was on Hee Haw and Happy Days. She was really sexy and Misty Rowe was the first woman on television who made me feel...different."

Personal life
Rowe was formerly married to actor James DePaiva, with whom she has a daughter, Dreama, born in 1992.

References

External links
 
 
 

1950 births
Living people
American television actresses
People from Glendora, California
21st-century American women